Frank Peeters (born 1947) is a Belgian fine art photographer.

In 1983, Peeters won the 1st prize in the 1st Biennal Internacional de Arte Fotografica/Escola Panamericana del Arte in São Paulo, Brazil followed by international exhibitions and publications. In 1984 his show, Greetings from Belgium, was exhibited at The Photographers' Gallery in London.

Awards
1981/82, 1982/83, 1983/84, 1984/85, 1987/88: 1st prize Nikon, Japan. Photo Contest International,
1982 Associateship (ARPS) of the Royal Photographic Society, Bath, United Kingdom (ARPS)
1983 First Prize le Biennal Internacional de Arte Fotografica /Escola Panamericana del Arte São Paulo, Brazil

Solo exhibitions

1983 Galerie Paule Pia, Antwerp, Belgium - Visions 
 Brewery Arts Centre, Kendal, UK. "New Belgian Photography" 1984 -Frank Peeters, Carl Fonteyne, Pierre Cordier and Hubert Grooteclaes
 Exhibition "New Belgian Photography", 3 October/3 November 1984 
1984 The Photographers' Gallery, London, UK -Greetings from Belgium 
1984 Studio Ethel, Boulevard St. Germain, Paris, France -Contrasts 
1984 Photofactory, Chateau Neuf, Oslo, Norway -Greetings from Belgium 
1985 Galerie The Compagnie, Hamburg, Germany -Contrasts & Visions 
1985 Nikon Gallery, London, UK -Contrasts 
1986 La Boîte à Images, Bern, Switzerland -Contrasts & Visions 
1986 Galerie Nei Liicht, Dudelange, Luxembourg - Contrasts 
1988 The Swan Tower, Kleve, Germany - Retrospective 1980/87

Books 
Frank Peeters Copyright, Monography 1988 by Edition Schwanenburg IM Artcolor Verlag D-4700 Hamm, Germany   
Contrasts & Visions, Frank Peeters, 1983 Introduction by B.Coe, I.Leijerzapf, D.Bohm, K.Van Deuren, R.Lassam   
Selection of work by Frank Peeters (monography) 1987 Royal Photographic Society, Bath, United Kingdom )
Frank Peeters - Photographs 1970–1990, 2008, (13×11 in, 33×28 cm)

References

External links
Museum für Kunst und Gewerbe Hamburg, Online Portfolio Visions http://sammlungonline.mkg-hamburg.de/de/search?s=Frank%20Peeters&h=0&sort=scoreDesc
Frank Peeters, works by the artist in Danish museums Portfolio Visions On Line =https://www.kulturarv.dk/kid/SoegKunstnerVaerker.do?kunstnerId=16131

1947 births
Photographers from Antwerp
Monochrome photography
Living people